The Association of Alabama Camps has represented the interests of the children and families who attend camps in Alabama, as well as the camps themselves since 1980. These camps serve around a quarter million children, parents, young adults and seniors each year. The Association's initial project was to contact the Alabama Department of Public Health and solicit their cooperation in developing the original camp inspection standards for Alabama. AAC supports in every way possible other camp organizations such as the American Camp Association and Christian Camp and Conference Association. AAC recognizes that every camp is different, each with a different purpose and serving different people for different reasons. The one thing all Alabama camps have in common is that we must operate our camps under the laws and regulations of the State of Alabama – AAC helps insure that camps have a voice in the regulatory and legislative bodies of Alabama.

AAC Board
Media Relations - Marjorie Davis
President - Allen McBride
Vice-President - Rob Hammond
Secretary/Treasurer - John Stephenson
Governmental Affairs - Kim Adams

Activities 
Some of the activities offered at Alabama Camps include:

Archery
Kickball
Basketball
Football
Leadership Workshops
Canoeing
Crafts
Disc Sports
Tennis
Kayaking
Rock Climbing
Outdoor Living Skills
Horseback
Water Skiing
Volleyball
Dodgeball
Swimming
Drama
Mountain Biking
Capture the Flag
Fishing
Dance
Team building
Putt-Putt
Nature Appreciation
Tetherball
Soccer
Water slides

References 

Summer camps in Alabama
1980 establishments in Alabama
Organizations established in 1980
Organizations based in Alabama